Rajesh Jaswanth Rai Mehta (born 20 June 1964) is an Indian billionaire businessman, based in Bangalore. He is the owner and executive chairman of the jewellery company Rajesh Exports. As of April 2017, Forbes estimated his net worth at $2.6 billion, making him the 61st richest person in India.

Early life
Rajesh Mehta was born on 20 June 1964 in Bengaluru, to Jasvantrai Mehta and Chandrika Ben Mehta. He was brought up in Bangalore in a lower-middle-class Jain family, the third of his three brothers– Bipin, Prashant, and Mahesh. His father migrated from Morbi (Gujarat) to Bangalore in 1946 and worked at a private firm. Later, he quit the job and started a small business of trading semi-precious stones in Gujarat under the name of ‘Rajesh Diamond Company’.

Career
He went to St. Joseph’s School and studied at National College for two years. He aspired to be a doctor, but chose his father’s jewellery business instead. He and his brother Prashant took over the family business. He approached Bipin, the eldest brother, who worked at a bank, for a loan of Rs 1,200 and started a silver trading business. He bought jewellery from Chennai and sold it back at Rajkot to their relatives at a profit. He gradually started selling jewellery to retailers and wholesalers based in Gujarat. They later started buying silver jewellery from Gujarat and sold it to retailers and wholesalers at Bangalore, Chennai, and Hyderabad. Through this way he popularized multiple ethnic Indian jewellery designs and cultures in different states of India. He formed an entity called ‘Rajesh Art Jewellers’ and started bartering goods. The company’s capital base increased by 50% with every barter cycle.
The silver jewellery business was successful, and Mehta moved into gold jewellery in 1989, setting up a 10-worker manufacturing unit in his garage at Bangalore. This company was named ‘Rajesh Exports’. It exported gold to United Kingdom, Dubai, Oman, Kuwait, the US, and Europe, and made a business of INR 20 million by the year 1992. The export business eventually grew to INR 1.2 billion by 1998.
Mehta then opened a standalone retail store, which is now called ‘Shubh Jewellers’. There are 81 Shubh stores in Karnataka.

Rajesh Exports
Mehta founded Rajesh Exports in 1989 along with his brother Prashant Mehta. The company quickly rose into prominence with its first organized gold jewellery manufacturing facility in India. In 1991, they also established the country’s first research and development facility in the jewellery sector.
Rajesh Exports processes 35% of the world’s gold. It is also listed in National Stock Exchange (NSE) and Bombay Stock Exchange (BSE). Rajesh Exports was included in the Fortune 500 list as the 423rd company.

Valcambi Exports
In 2015 Rajesh Exports acquired Valcambi, the world’s largest gold refining  facility, based in Switzerland. It can produce 400 tons of small sized gold bars and 500 tons of kilo bars every year. The gold bars produced are certified by the London Bullion Market Association (LBMA).

Awards and recognition
Udhyog Shree Award
Jeweller of the Year Award presented by the Karnataka Government 
Jain Bhusan presented by the Jain Social Group
Outstanding Businessman Award presented by Harun Business Institute of China
Indian Affairs Transformational Business Leader of the Year 2018 by Satya Brahma founded India Leadership Conclave 2018.
Indian Affairs Transformational Business Reformer of the Year 2021 by Satya Brahma founded India Leadership Conclave 2021.

Personal life
Rajesh Mehta is the son of Chandrika Ben Mehta and is married to Leena Mehta.

His son Siddharth Mehta is the head of information technology team at Rajesh Exports Bangalore, which builts customised software for in-house processes.

References

Businesspeople from Bangalore
Living people
1964 births
Indian billionaires
Indian Jains